The 1912 Iowa State Cyclones football team represented Iowa State College of Agriculture and Mechanic Arts—now known as Iowa State University—as a member of the Missouri Valley Conference (MVC) during the 1912 college football season. Led by Clyde Williams in his sixth and final season as head coach, the Cyclones compiled an overall record of 6–2 with a mark of 2–0 in conference play, sharing the MVC title with Nebraska for the season consecutive year.

Schedule

References

Iowa State
Iowa State Cyclones football seasons
Missouri Valley Conference football champion seasons
Iowa State Cyclones football